Robert Keith Selander (July 21, 1927 – June 14, 2015) was an American evolutionary biologist and emeritus professor at Pennsylvania State University. Known for his studies of molecular genetics, he was elected to the National Academy of Sciences in 1982.

References

External links

 Howard Ochman, "Robert K. Selander", Biographical Memoirs of the National Academy of Sciences (2022)

1927 births
2015 deaths
American geneticists
Evolutionary biologists
Members of the United States National Academy of Sciences
Pennsylvania State University faculty